The 2000–01 Club Atlético Boca Juniors season was the 71st consecutive Primera División season played by the senior squad.

Summary
The season is best remembered due to the clinching of 2000 Intercontinental Cup against heavily favourites and 1999-2000 UEFA Champions League Champions Real Madrid thanks to 2 goals of Martin Palermo. In the second half of the season, the club won the 2001 Copa Libertadores for the second consecutive year  aimed by the talent of Juan Roman Riquelme and a superb performance in the Finals of Cordoba. As of December 2020, the Back-to-back Boca title was the last time a team could reach that performance in Copa Libertadores.   Also, the squad won the Apertura Tournament finishing 4 points ahead of River Plate and Gimnasia La Plata.

Squad

Transfers

January

Competitions

Torneo Apertura

League table

Position by round

Torneo Clausura

League table

Position by round

Copa Mercosur

Group stage

Final stage

Copa Libertadores

Group stage

Final stage

Intercontinental Cup

Statistics

Players statistics

References

External links
 Club Atlético Boca Juniors official web site 

Boc
Club Atlético Boca Juniors seasons